The following outline is provided as an overview of and topical guide to infrastructure of the U.S. state of Washington.

By era
This section lists a few of the largest infrastructure projects of each century since non-Indigenous settlement.

Mid 19th century
Initial settlement of the state
Naches Trails (1853)
Mullan Road (1859–1860)

Late 19th century
Early industrialization, Age of Rail

Cascade Tunnel (1897–1900)
Stampede Tunnel (1886–1888)

20th century
Rapid industrialization during World Wars, suburbanization of Seattle area
Lake Washington Ship Canal (opens 1917)
Columbia Basin Project (1933–1950s)
Hanford Site (1940s through Cold War)
Mount Baker Tunnel (1940)
Lake Washington Floating Bridges (1940s–1989)
Boeing Everett Factory (1967)
Interstate 5 (completed 1969) and Interstate 90 (completed 1993)

21st century
Amazon development in South Lake Union (2008–present)
Hanford Vit Plant (2023)
Link light rail (1996–present)
Connecting Washington (2015–present)

By topic

General
List of Seattle megaprojects

Communication and computing
Alaska United-East submarine fiber optic cable
Jim Creek Naval Radio Station
Northwest Open Access Network
PC-1 transpacific submarine fiber optic cable
Quincy data centers
Columbia Data Center
Seattle Internet Exchange
Washington-Alaska Military Cable and Telegraph System
Washington K-20 Network
LORAN-C transmitter George

Energy
:Category:Energy infrastructure in Washington (state)
Electricity in the Puget Sound region
List of Public Utility Districts of Washington (state)
Wind power in Washington (state)

High Voltage DC (HVDC)
Juan de Fuca Cable Project (abandoned)

Hydro
Washington is a major hydroelectric producer in the United States and the world. The Grand Coulee Dam on the Columbia River was the world's largest when built, and remains the largest power station in the United States by capacity.

List of dams in the Columbia River watershed

Natural gas
Jackson Prairie Underground Natural Gas Storage Facility
Northwest Pipeline

Nuclear

Commercial power production
Columbia Generating Station
Kiket Island, land purchased but never built
Satsop Nuclear Power Plant, nearly completed but never fueled
Skagit Nuclear Power Plant, never built

Research reactors (civilian)
Fast Flux Test Facility, Hanford Site
More Hall Annex, formerly the Nuclear Reactor Building, UW Seattle
Washington State University Reactor, WSU Pullman

Other
Centralia Power Plant, the only coal fired power plant in the state
Grays Harbor Biodiesel Plant
Spokane waste-to-energy plant

Environmental and scientific

Weather and climate
AgriMet Pacific Northwest Region (U.S. Bureau of Reclamation)
AgWeatherNet (Washington State University), crop freezes and hailstorms
Camano Island Doppler radar
Langley Hill Doppler radar
RAWS network (US Forest Service), over 100 sensors in Washington, for assessing wildfire risk and forest health

Ocean
NEPTUNE, methane clathrates
Ocean Observatories Initiative
Endurance Array, anoxia events
Regional Scale Nodes, methane hydrates and underwater volcanism

Natural hazards
Earthquakes and tsunamis
Pacific Northwest Seismic Network (Northwest university consortium)
Deep-ocean Assessment and Reporting of Tsunamis (National Oceanic and Atmospheric Administration)
Volcanism
Cascades Volcano Observatory
Mount Rainier Volcano Lahar Warning System

Space and cosmology

LIGO Hanford
Manastash Ridge Observatory
Rattlesnake Mountain Observatory (relocated to Wallula), the largest optical instrument in the state

Military complexes

Army, Navy, Air Force, Joint
Fairchild Air Force Base
Joint Base Lewis-McChord (also adjacent Camp Murray, Washington National Guard)
Naval Air Station Whidbey Island
Naval Base Kitsap
Naval Station Everett
Puget Sound Naval Shipyard
Yakima Training Center

Former
For earlier 19th century forts, see List of forts#Washington

Fort Lawton, Seattle
Fort Flagler, Fort Worden, Fort Casey, Puget Sound approaches
Naval Reserve Armory (Lake Union, Seattle)
Naval Station Puget Sound (Lake Washington, Seattle)
Seattle Center Armory
Yakima Research Station

Civilianized airfields
For a full list of Army airfields see Washington World War II Army Airfields. The Navy also civilianized several fields.

Arlington Airport, formerly Arlington Naval Air Auxiliary Facility
Olympia Regional Airport, formerly a satellite field for McChord Air Force Base
Sanderson Field, Shelton
Paine Field at Everett, formerly Paine Air Force Base
Tri-Cities Airport, formerly Naval Air Station Pasco, one of the busiest training fields of World War II
Vista Field, an auxiliary field
Grant County International Airport at Moses Lake, formerly Larson Air Force Base, a Strategic Air Command base, with 13,500-foot runway and Titan nuclear missile field
William R. Fairchild International Airport, formerly Port Angeles Army Airfield
Bowers Airport, formerly Ellensburg Army Airfield
Ephrata Municipal Airport, formerly Ephrata Army Air Base
Spokane International Airport, formerly Geiger Field
Deer Park Airport, an auxiliary field, also Atlas-E nuclear missile silo 
Felts Field, an auxiliary field

Department of Energy
Hanford Site
Hanford Tank Waste Treatment and Immobilization Plant (Vitrification plant)
B Reactor
N-Reactor
 Plutonium Finishing Plant
 Plutonium-Uranium Extraction Plant / PUREX Plant
 Plutonium Recycle Test Reactor (PRTR)

US Coast Guard
Coast Guard Station Seattle also District 13 headquarters, Sector Puget Sound headquarters, Puget Sound Sector Command Center–Joint, and others
Coast Guard Station Cape Disappointment

Transportation

Air
List of airports in Washington

Rail
List of Washington railroads

Road
State highways in Washington
List of Interstate Highways in Washington
List of U.S. Routes in Washington
List of state routes in Washington

Ports and canals

Canals (active)
Constructed canals only
Lake Washington Ship Canal / Chittenden Locks (Ballard locks), Seattle
Port Townsend Ship Canal

Canals (abandoned)
Cascade Locks and Canal, Columbia River
Celilo Canal, Columbia River

Ports
Port of Camas-Washougal
Port of Grays Harbor
Port of Longview
Port of Mattawa
Port of Olympia
Port of Seattle
Port of Tacoma
Port of Vancouver USA
Port of Whitman County

Water management
List of dams and reservoirs in Washington

Flood control
McNary Levee System, Columbia River (Tri-Cities)
Seattle seawall

Volcanic
Volcano-related infrastructure around Mount St. Helens related to its 1980 eruption and future eruptions

Spirit Lake Outlet Tunnel
Toutle River Sediment Retention Structure

Flumes and siphons

Electron Hydroelectric Project

Irrigation

Columbia Basin Project, largest reclamation project in United States
Potholes Reservoir: 670,000 irrigated acres
Grand Coulee Dam
Okanogan Project
Conconully Dam and Reservoir
Salmon Lake Dam and Conconully Lake
Salmon Creek Diversion Dam
Yakima Project, 464,000 irrigable acres
Bumping Lake
Cle Elum Dam / Cle Elum Lake
Clear Creek Dam
Kachess Dam / Lake Kachess
Keechelus Dam
Tieton Dam

Municipal water supply

Casad Dam (Bremerton watershed)
McAllister Wellfield (Olympia)
Culmback Dam / Spada Reservoir (Sultan River - City of Everett)
Seattle Public Utilities
 – watershed
Chester Morse Lake and masonry dam
Tolt pipeline (Cascades to Seattle)
Tacoma Public Utilities
Howard A. Hanson Dam and reservoir

Wastewater
Brightwater sewage treatment plant (Bothell)
Everett Water Pollution Control Facility
Riverside Park Water Reclamation Facility (Spokane)
South Treatment Plant (Renton)
Spokane County Regional Water Reclamation Facility
Tacoma Central Wastewater Treatment Plant
West Point Treatment Plant (West Point (Seattle))

By type

Bridges

:Category:Bridges in Washington (state)
List of bridges in Seattle

Floating bridges
Washington has more floating bridges than any other state, and the world's three longest ones, including:
Evergreen Point Floating Bridge (2016) (SR 520 or "Evergreen Point"), replaced the 1963 Evergreen Point Floating Bridge, and is world's longest
Lacey V. Murrow Memorial Bridge (I-90), second longest in world
Hood Canal Bridge, world's third longest floating bridge overall, and the longest floating bridge on tidal saltwater
Homer M. Hadley Memorial Bridge (I-90), fifth longest in world

Historically notable bridges and incidents
List of Washington state bridge failures
Chow Chow Bridge one of the first cable-stayed bridge designs in the United States, and the first in Washington
Hood Canal Bridge partially sank during storm
Tacoma Narrows Bridge (1940), "Galloping Gertie", collapsed during windstorm four months after opening
Lacey V. Murrow Memorial Bridge, sank during storm

Dams
List of dams and reservoirs in Washington

Pipelines
Avista gas pipeline
Ferndale Pipeline System
McChord Pipeline (jet fuel)
Northwest Pipeline (natural gas)
Olympic pipeline (Olympic pipeline explosion) (petroleum)
Tesoro Logistics pipeline
Trans Mountain Pipeline
Tolt pipeline (water)

Roads

Historically notable roads include
:Category:Historic trails and roads in Washington (state)
Oregon Trail wagon trail to Whitman Mission, Walla Walla (1843)
Naches Trail, first wagon road to cross the Cascades (1853)
Maryhill Loops Road, first asphalt paved road in Washington (1911)
Yellowstone Trail, first transcontinental automobile highway to Seattle (1912)

Tunnels
Cascade Tunnel
Stampede Tunnel
List of tunnels in Seattle

Highways
State highways in Washington
List of Interstate Highways in Washington

Railroads
Ballard Terminal Railroad
BNSF Railway
Bellingham Subdivision
Columbia River Subdivision
Kettle Falls Subdivision
Lakeside Subdivision
Lakeview Subdivision
Lakewood Subdivision
Scenic Subdivision
Seattle Subdivision
Spokane Subdivision
Sumas Subdivision
Yakima Valley Subdivision
Cascade and Columbia River Railroad
Central Washington Railroad
Columbia and Cowlitz Railway
Eastern Washington Gateway Railroad
Fairhaven and Southern Railroad
Kettle Falls International Railway
Mount Vernon Terminal Railway
Olympia and Belmore Railroad
Pend Oreille Valley Railroad
Puget Sound and Pacific Railroad
Tacoma Rail
Tri-City Railroad
Union Pacific Railroad
Washington and Idaho Railway

Passenger train service

Amtrak
Cascades
Coast Starlight
Empire Builder
North Coast Hiawatha
Pacific International
Pioneer
Sounder commuter rail

Mass transit

Public transportation benefit area
Sound Transit
Link light rail
Sound Transit Express
Sounder commuter rail
Seattle Streetcar

See also
Outline of Washington (state)

Footnotes

References

Washington (state)-related lists
 
Washington